Clivina monticola is a species of ground beetle in the subfamily Scaritinae. It was described by Andrewes in 1931.

References

monticola
Beetles described in 1931